Iresine pedicellata is a species of plant in the family Amaranthaceae. It is endemic to Ecuador.  Its natural habitat is subtropical or tropical dry forests. It is threatened by habitat loss.

References

pedicellata
Endemic flora of Ecuador
Vulnerable plants
Taxonomy articles created by Polbot